Cyrtodactylus lekaguli, also known commonly as the tuk-kai Boonsong bent-toed gecko, is a species of lizard in the family Gekkonidae. The species is endemic to Thailand.

Etymology
The specific name, lekaguli, is in honor of Thai herpetologist Boonsong Lekagul (1907–1992).

Geographic range
C. lekaguli is found in southern Thailand, in the provinces of Phang Nga, Suret Thani, and Trang.

Habitat
The preferred natural habitats of C. lekaguli are forest and dry caves.

Description
Adult females are slightly smaller than adult males, an example of sexual dimorphism.

Reproduction
The mode of reproduction of C. lekaguli is unknown.

References

Further reading
Grismer LL, Wood PL, Quah ESH, Anuar S, Muin MA, Sumontha M, Ahmad N, Bauer AM, Wangkulangkul S, Grismer JL, Pauwels OSG (2012). "A phylogeny and taxonomy of the Thai-Malay Peninsula Bent-toed Geckos of the Cyrtodactylus pulchellus complex (Squamata: Gekkonidae): combined morphological and molecular analyses with descriptions of seven new species". Zootaxa 3520: 1–55. (Cyrtodactylus lekaguli, new species).

Cyrtodactylus
Reptiles described in 2012
Endemic fauna of Thailand
Reptiles of Thailand